Heliophanus heurtaultae is a jumping spider species in the genus Heliophanus. It was first identified in 2002 and lives in Guinea.

References

Salticidae
Fauna of Guinea
Spiders of Africa
Spiders described in 2002
Taxa named by Wanda Wesołowska